Cianciolo is a surname of Italian origin, with the meaning of surrounding net. 
Notable people with this surname are:

Ernesto Cianciolo (1856-1905), Italian politician, major of Messina
Susan Cianciolo (born 1969), American fashion designer and artist.

See also 
Ciancio
Ciancia